In physics, rotatum is the derivative of torque with respect to time. Expressed as an equation, rotatum Ρ is:

The term rotatum is not universally recognized but is commonly used. This word is derived from the Latin word rotātus meaning to rotate.  The units of rotatum are force times distance per time, or equivalently, mass times length squared per time cubed; in the SI unit system this is kilogram metre squared per second cubed (kg·m2/s3), or Newtons times meter per second (N·m/s).

Relation to other physical quantities

Newton's second law for angular motion says that:

where L is angular momentum, so if we combine the above two equations:

If the moment of inertia is not changing over time (i.e. it is constant), then:

which can also be written as:

where  is angular jerk.

Dynamics (mechanics)
Torque